Appalachian Ohio is a bioregion and political unit in the southeastern part of the U.S. state of Ohio, characterized by the western foothills of the Appalachian Mountains and the Appalachian Plateau. The Appalachian Regional Commission defines the region as consisting of thirty-two counties. This region roughly overlaps with the Appalachian mixed-mesophytic forests, which begin in southeast Ohio and southwest Pennsylvania and continue south to Georgia and Alabama. The mixed-mesophytic forest is found only in Central and Southern Appalachia and eastern/central China.  It is one of the most biodiverse temperate forests in the world.

Geologically, Appalachian Ohio corresponds closely to the terminal moraine of an ancient glacier that runs southwest to northeast through the state.  Areas south and east of the moraine are characterized by rough, irregular hills and hollows, characteristic of the Allegheny Plateau and Cumberland Plateaus of the western Appalachian Plateau System.  Unlike eastern Appalachia, this region does not have long fin-like ridges like those of the Ridge-and-Valley Appalachians subranges, but a network of rocky hollows and hills going in all directions.

The region is considered part of "central Appalachia", a political, cultural, and bioregional classification that includes southeastern Ohio, Eastern Kentucky, most of West Virginia and Southwestern Virginia.

Counties and county seats 

The Governor's Office of Appalachia subdivides the 32 counties of Appalachian Ohio into three smaller regions: East Central Ohio, South East Ohio, and Southern Ohio. The following lists include each county in the region and its county seat.

Cities
Appalachian Ohio has several cities within its borders, which as of the 2010 census included the following localities:
Youngstown Population:  66,982 Mahoning County and Trumbull County
Warren Population:  41,557 Trumbull County
Zanesville Population:  25,487 Muskingum County
Athens Population:   23,832 Athens County
Chillicothe Population:  21,901 Ross County
Ashtabula Population:  19,124 Ashtabula County
Niles Population:  19,266 Trumbull County
Portsmouth Population:  20,226 Scioto County
Steubenville Population:  18,659 Jefferson County
New Philadelphia Population:  17,288 Tuscarawas County
Marietta Population:  14,085 Washington County
East Liverpool Population:  11,195 Columbiana County
Conneaut Population:  12,841 Ashtabula County
Salem Population:  12,303 Mahoning County and Columbiana County
Dover Population: 12,826 Tuscarawas County
Struthers Population:  10,713 Mahoning County
Coshocton Population:  11,216  Coshocton County
Cambridge Population:  10,635 Guernsey County
Ironton Population:  11,129 Lawrence County
Girard Population:  9,958 Trumbull County
Hubbard Population:  7,874 Trumbull County
Campbell Population:  8,235 Mahoning County
Canfield Population:  7,515 Mahoning County
Martins Ferry Population:  6,915 Belmont County
Cortland Population:  7,104 Trumbull County
Logan Population:  7,152 Hocking County
Belpre Population:  6,441 Washington County
Geneva Population:  6,215 Ashtabula County
Columbiana Population:  6,384 Mahoning County and Columbiana County
Hillsboro Population:  6,605 Highland County
Jackson Population:  6,397 Jackson County
Wellston Population:  5,663 Jackson County
Nelsonville Population:  5,392 Athens County
St. Clairsville Population:  5,184 Belmont County

Transportation 

John Glenn Columbus International Airport, in Columbus, is the largest airport and serves most of the residents in southeast Ohio. John Glenn offers primarily domestic flights. Cincinnati/Northern Kentucky International Airport to the southwest serves most of the residents of Cincinnati and its metropolitan area, and Cleveland Hopkins International Airport to the north is also a major hub airport.

Appalachian Regional Commission

The Appalachian Regional Commission was formed in 1965 to aid economic development in the Appalachian region, which was lagging far behind the rest of the nation on most economic indicators.  The Appalachian region currently defined by the commission includes 420 counties in 13 states, including 32 counties in Ohio.  The commission gives each county one of five possible economic designations— distressed, at-risk, transitional, competitive, or attainment— with "distressed" counties being the most economically endangered and "attainment" counties being the most economically prosperous.  These designations are based primarily on three indicators— three-year average unemployment rate, market income per capita, and poverty rate.  In 2009, Appalachian Ohio had a three-year average unemployment rate of 8.4%, compared with 7.5% statewide and 6.6% nationwide.  In 2008, Appalachian Ohio had a per capita market income of $22,294, compared with $29,344 statewide and $34,004 nationwide.  In 2009, Appalachian Ohio had a poverty rate of 16%, compared to 13.6% statewide and 13.5% nationwide.  Seven Ohio counties—Adams, Athens, Meigs, Morgan, Noble, Pike and Vinton—were designated "distressed", while nine—Ashtabula, Gallia, Guernsey, Harrison, Jackson, Lawrence, Monroe, Perry and Scioto—were designated "at-risk".  The remaining half of Appalachian Ohio counties were designated "transitional", meaning they lagged behind the national average on one of the three key indicators.  No counties in Ohio were given the "attainment" or "competitive" designations.

Athens County had Appalachian Ohio's highest poverty rating, with 32.8% of its residents living below the poverty line.  Clermont had Appalachian Ohio's highest per capita income ($30,515) and Holmes had the lowest unemployment rate (5.5%). Washington County has the highest high school graduation rate (84.5%), while Adams County has the lowest (68.6%). Although Holmes County has a significantly lower high school graduation rate than Adams County at 51.5%, its graduation rates are somewhat skewed compared to the rest of the region, due to the county's high population of Amish, whose children do not attend school past the eighth grade.

Notable people
Notable Americans from Appalachian Ohio include:

  John Glenn, former United States Marine Corps pilot, astronaut, and United States senator. First American to orbit the Earth.
  Sarah Jessica Parker, actress and producer
  Nancy Zimpher, chancellor of the State University of New York system
  Dean Martin, actor
  Lou Groza, football placekicker and offensive tackle for Cleveland Browns and member of the Pro Football Hall of Fame
  Jimmy the Greek
  Clark Gable, actor
  George Custer, served in the American Civil War and was killed in the Battle of Little Big Horn
  Ulysses S. Grant, 18th US president (1869–1877)
  William McKinley, 25th US president (1897–1901)
  Cy Young, Major League Baseball pitcher. The Cy Young Award is given annually to the best pitcher in MLB.
  Cody Garbrandt, UFC fighter
  Stephen Kappes, Deputy Director of the CIA during the Bush and Obama administrations
  Maya Lin, architect and designer of the Vietnam War Memorial in Washington, D.C.
  Katie Smith, Three-time Olympic gold medal winner with Team USA basketball; two-time WNBA champion and Ohio State University standout
  Joe Burrow, quarterback for the Cincinnati Bengals, number one pick in the 2020 NFL Draft and winner of the 2019 Heisman Trophy
  Jack Roush, founder, CEO, and co-owner of the NASCAR team Roush-Fenway Racing.
  Ambrose Bierce, author
  Mike Palagyi, Major League Baseball pitcher
  J. T. Miller, professional ice hockey player and alternate captain for the Vancouver Canucks

See also

Appalachian music
Appalachian studies
Asimina triloba
Critical pedagogy
Hocking Hills
Log cabin
Melungeon
Ohio University
Settlement school
Shawnee State Park
Southern Illinois
Southern Indiana
Underground Railroad
War on Poverty
Wayne National Forest
Youngstown State University
Zaleski State Forest

References

Further reading
Billings, Dwight B. and Kathleen M. Blee "Agriculture and Poverty in the Kentucky Mountains: Beech Creek, 1850–1910" in Appalachia in the Making: The Mountain South in the Nineteenth Century, eds. Pudup  et al. Chapel Hill: University of North Carolina Press, 1995.
Blethen, H. Tyler "Pioneer Settlement" in High Mountains Rising: Appalachia in Time and Place, eds. Straw and Blethen. Urbana and Chicago: University of Illinois Press, 2004.
Davis, Donald Edward. "A Whole World Dying" and "Medicinal and Cultural Uses of Plants in the Southern Appalachians" in Homeplace Geography: Essays for Appalachia. Macon, GA: Mercer University Press, 2006.
Lewis, Ronald L. "Railroads, Deforestation, and the Transformation of Agriculture in the West Virginia Back Counties, 1880–1920" in Appalachia in the Making: The Mountain South in the Nineteenth Century, eds. Pudup  et al. Chapel Hill: University of North Carolina Press, 1995.
Salstrom, Paul. "Newer Appalachia as One of America's Last Frontiers" in Appalachia in the Making: The Mountain South in the Nineteenth Century, eds. Pudup  et al. Chapel Hill: University of North Carolina Press, 1995.

External links

Foundation for Appalachian Ohio
Tending the Commons: Folklife and Landscape in Southern West Virginia
Appalachian Studies Association
Center for Appalachian Studies and Services
Center for Appalachian Studies
Appalachian Regional Studies, Radford University
Appalachia: Land and People (Ohio University Professor Geoff Buckley's Syllabus)

 
Geography of Appalachia
Allegheny Plateau
Regions of Ohio